Si Jiahui (born 11 July 2002) is a Chinese snooker player.

Career 
In May 2019, Si qualified for the 2019–20 and 2020–21 professional Main Tour as Q School, as the highest ranked player on the Q School ranking list who didn't reach the semi-finals of any of the three events.

Si's first wins as a professional were a 4–0 victory over Soheil Vahedi in the first round and 4–1 against Stuart Bingham in second round of the 2019 English Open.

As an amateur, Si beat Shaun Murphy in the first round of the 2021 UK Championship. Murphy commented, "he [Si] played like a man who does not have a care in the world, because he does not have a care in the world. It is not fair, it is not right. I am not picking on him as a young man, he deserved his victory. Amateurs should not be allowed in professional tournaments, the end. This is our livelihood. This is how I put food on the table. This is how I earn money. Since turning professional at 15, I have earned the right to call myself a professional snooker player. He hasn't done that. He shouldn't be on the table."

Si won the 2022 WSF Open, defeating Lee Stephens 5–0 in the final and thus earning a two-year tour card for the 2022–23 and 2023–24 seasons.

Performance and rankings timeline

Career finals

Amateur finals: 3 (2 titles)

References

External links 
 Si Jiahui at worldsnooker.com

Living people
Chinese snooker players
2002 births
21st-century Chinese people